Olaf Brockhoff (26 July 1905 – 22 September 1974) was a Danish footballer. He played in two matches for the Denmark national football team from 1935 to 1936.

References

External links
 

1905 births
1974 deaths
Danish men's footballers
Denmark international footballers
People from Nørresundby
Association football defenders
Esbjerg fB players